Judith McBurney (19 May 1948 – 1 December 2018) was an Australian actress and model. She is best known for serial The Young Doctors in 1,300 episodes as Tania Livingstone and also appeared in cult series Prisoner as Sandra" Pixie" Mason in 96 episodes.

Early career
Before acting, McBurney started a successful career as a model employed by June Dally-Watkins. One of her first acting roles was in late 1969, in a supporting role in Peter Weir's short movie Michael, one of three short movies released under the title Three to Go. It followed by small parts in ABC TV-plays and guest roles in other TV series. Her first leading role was in 1972 as Ella Belairs in ABC's adaption of The Cousin from Fiji, based on a novel by Norman Lindsay. Another early and memorable role was as Aldith in Seven Little Australians.

Television soap operas

In late 1973, McBurney was cast in the role of key new character Marilyn McDonald in Number 96 but before any of her scenes had gone to air and with about 30 scenes in the can she had to withdraw from the role due to illness. This left her replacement, Frances Hargreaves, to reshoot all of McBurney's scenes.

McBurney then went into the ongoing role of plain-Jane secretary Jane Fowler in The Box in late 1975, and later played the brief role of Jodi in Number 96. Subsequently, she became immensely popular playing the part of nurse Tania Livingston in The Young Doctors. She played the role from 1977 until the series ended in 1982. She followed this with another popular character, that of breezy romantic Sandra "Pixie" Mason in Prisoner for 96 episodes. She played Pixie on a recurring basis from 1983 to 1985. In later years she appeared in a few episodes of Always Greener.

McBurney was also famous for her voice-over work and also starring in commercials, in particular a very cheeky, controversial ad from the 1980s for Palmolive Gold, in which she features in a bed with actor Peter Mochrie. McBurney leaves a cake of soap under his pillow, which led to the famous jingle and saying "Don't wait to be told".

Personal life and death
McBurney retired from acting in 2002 to become an educated healer. She also went on to teach modelling and acting for young people. McBurney died of cancer on 1 December 2018.

Filmography

FILM

TELEVISION

References

External links
 The Official Judy McBurney Website
 

1948 births
2018 deaths
Australian female models
Australian film actresses
Australian television actresses
Australian voice actresses
Folk healers
20th-century Australian actresses